Nogowczyce  is a village in the administrative district of Gmina Ujazd, within Strzelce County, Opole Voivodeship, in south-western Poland.

The village has a population of 290.

Gallery

References

Nogowczyce